Pradeep Kumar  is an Indian television producer. He made his debut with TV serial Kagaar as production manager.

Early life
Kumar was born and raised in West Champaran, Bihar. His father is Prem Kishore Prasad and his mother is Phulbadan Devi. His grandfather was Gaya Prasad. 

He completed his early education in his village Jhakhra, Gopalpur and his higher education in Bettiah.

Career 
He moved from Bihar to Mumbai to work as a door seller and as a waiter in hotel. He got his break as a production manager with Kagaar. In 2001, he came up with his first Bollywood film ‘Kitne Door Kitne Paas starring Fardeen Khan’ and Amrita Arora.

In the year 2004 he started as an independent production head with Shakuntalam Telefilms and did shows like Reth, Banoo Mai Teri Dulhan, Naa Aana Iss Des Laado, Sapne Suhane Ladakpan Ke, Shastri Sisters. He left the company in 2014 and started his own company Paperback Films with Ravindra Gauta. They produced a show for StarPlus Meri Durga and one web series Voot with Ajay Rai (Jar Pictures). Pre-production commenced in October 2015 (pilot episode shot in 2016) got a go-ahead in June 2016 and the show aired on 26 January 2017.

In 2018 he started his own company Shaika films with his actress wife Shaika Parween. They collaborated on their first film project Bamfaad with Ajay Rai (Jar Pictures). In the same year (2018) they collaborated with Rajesh Ram Singh (Cockcrow pictures) and started the work under the joint banner Cockcrow & Shaika Entertainment. They produced a show Jaat Naa Puchho Prem Ki and Choti Sarrdaarni. They produced a Marathi web series Kaale Dhande for ZEE5. He worked on Banoo Main Teri Dulhan, Na Aana Is Des Laado and Shastri Sisters. In 2020, they produced Ghum Hai Kisikey Pyaar Mein for StarPlus, a Hindi remake of Bengali serial Kusum Dola.

In November 2021, they produced Kaamnaa for SET India which is an inspirational remake of Pakistani series Mere Paas Tum Ho.
In December 2021, they produced Kabhi Kabhie Ittefaq Sey for StarPlus which is a Hindi remake of Bengali Series Khorkuto along with the Magic Moments Motion Pictures producers of original Bengali series.

Television

Filmography

References

External links
 

Living people
Indian television producers
Year of birth missing (living people)